Monfort Heights is a census-designated place (CDP) in Green Township, Hamilton County, Ohio, United States, part of the Cincinnati–Northern Kentucky metropolitan area. The population of Monfort Heights was 12,070 at the 2020 census. In previous censuses, the area was listed as two separate CDPs, Monfort Heights East and Monfort Heights South.

History
The community was earlier known as "Wisenburg" or "Wisenburgh" A post office named "Monfort" was established on March 17, 1900, with Frank Lumler as its first postmaster. The office was named in honor of Civil War Captain Elias Riggs Monfort, who was then the postmaster of Cincinnati. The office was discontinued on September 14, 1905. The name almost disappeared until the late 1920s when a name was needed for a new school district after the consolidation of three area districts and the name "Monfort Heights" was selected.

A 1944 study cited a population of 250 for Monfort Heights in 1920.

The first Cincinnati area McDonald's was opened by Lou Groen in Monfort Heights in 1959. It was at this restaurant that he created the iconic Filet-O-Fish sandwich to lure his Catholic customers during lent and on Fridays.

Geography
The community "runs along North Bend Road with its heart at the intersection of West Fork and North Bend Roads." Just south of this intersection is Exit 14 of Interstate 74 which runs east–west through the CDP.

Notable person
 Bonnie Lou, music and TV star

References

Further reading
 

Census-designated places in Hamilton County, Ohio
Census-designated places in Ohio
Geography of Hamilton County, Ohio
Populated places established in 1900
1900 establishments in Ohio